King's Theatre was a live entertainment venue on the corner of Hammersmith Road and Rowan Road, London W14. With a seating capacity of 3,000, it was built in 1902 as a music hall.

History
The theatre was designed by W. G. R. Sprague for entrepreneur J. B. Mulholland, who also built the New Wimbledon Theatre. The first show was a pantomime, Cinderella, which opened on 26 December 1902.

In 1954 it was refitted by the BBC as a temporary studio while their Television Theatre complex was being upgraded. It also served as a recording studio for radio programs.

The BBC sold the building in 1959 and it was demolished in 1963.

References 

Demolished theatres in London
Theatres in the London Borough of Hammersmith and Fulham